The men's 200 metres was an event at the 1992 Summer Olympics in Barcelona, Spain. There were 79 participating athletes from 65 nations, with eleven qualifying heats. The maximum number of athletes per nation had been set at 3 since the 1930 Olympic Congress. The event was won by Michael Marsh of the United States, the nation's third consecutive and 15th overall victory in the event. The Americans would take a second medal for the third consecutive Games as well, this time with Michael Bates earning bronze. The silver medal went to Frankie Fredericks, taking Namibia's first medal in the men's 200 metres.

Background

This was the 21st appearance of the event, which was not held at the first Olympics in 1896 but has been on the program ever since. Four of the eight finalists from the 1988 Games returned: bronze medalist Robson da Silva of Brazil, fourth-place finisher Linford Christie of Great Britain, fifth-place finisher Atlee Mahorn of Canada, and sixth-place finisher Gilles Quénéhervé of France. Michael Johnson was the favorite coming into the Games; he had won the 1991 World Championship and was ranked #1 in the world in 1990 and 1991. He had been beaten in June by Frankie Fredericks of Namibia, however, and teammate Michael Marsh had been only 0.07 seconds behind Johnson at the U.S. trials. Before the Games, Johnson came down with food poisoning; while he still competed, he was clearly not at full strength.

Bahrain, the Central African Republic, Cyprus, Grenada, Mauritania, Namibia, Niger, San Marino, and Togo each made their debut in the event. Some former Soviet republics competed as the Unified Team. One Yugoslav athlete competed as an Independent Olympic Participant. The United States made its 20th appearance, most of any nation, having missed only the boycotted 1980 Games.

Competition format

The competition used the four round format introduced in 1920: heats, quarterfinals, semifinals, and a final. The "fastest loser" system introduced in 1960 was used in the heats and quarterfinals.

There were 11 heats of 7 or 8 runners each, with the top 3 men in each advancing to the quarterfinals along with the next 7 fastest overall. The quarterfinals consisted of 5 heats of 8 athletes each; the 3 fastest men in each heat and the next fastest overall advanced to the semifinals. There were 2 semifinals, each with 8 runners. The top 4 athletes in each semifinal advanced. The final had 8 runners. The races were run on a 400 metre track.

Records

These were the standing world and Olympic records (in seconds) prior to the 1992 Summer Olympics.

Michael Marsh set a new Olympic and American record with 19.73 seconds in his semifinal.

Schedule

The schedule featured three days of competition for the first time since 1908, up from two days in previous Games, with the semifinals and final on separate days.

All times are Central European Summer Time (UTC+2)

Results

Heats

Heat 1

Heat 2

Heat 3

Heat 4

Quénéhervé was originally disqualified, putting Seaksarn Boonrat in third place and qualifying the Thai runner for the quarterfinals. When Quénéhervé was reinstated, both men advanced on placement (Seaksarn Boonrat would have advanced on time, but this resulted in him not using one of the "lucky loser" places).

Heat 5

Heat 6

Heat 7

Heat 8

Heat 9

Heat 10

Heat 11

Quarterfinals

Quarterfinal 1

Quarterfinal 2

Quarterfinal 3

Quarterfinal 4

Quarterfinal 5

Semifinals

Semifinal 1

Semifinal 2

Final

Held on August 6, 1992.

See also
 1988 Men's Olympic Games 200 metres (Seoul)
 1990 Men's European Championships 200 metres (Split)
 1991 Men's World Championships 200 metres (Tokyo)
 1993 Men's World Championships 200 metres (Stuttgart)
 1994 Men's European Championships 200 metres (Helsinki)
 1995 Men's World Championships 200 metres (Gothenburg)
 1996 Men's Olympic Games 200 metres (Atlanta)

References

External links
 Official Report
 Results

 
200 metres at the Olympics
Men's events at the 1992 Summer Olympics